Jack Stevens (1896–1969) was a senior officer in the Australian Army.

Jack Stevens may also refer to:
 Jack Stevens (cinematographer) (1903–1961), American cinematographer
 Jack Stevens (Australian footballer) (1929–2013), Australian rules footballer for Geelong and South Melbourne
 Jack Stevens (footballer, born 1909) (1909 – after 1943), English association footballer for Stockport County and Brighton & Hove Albion
 Jack Stevens (footballer, born 1997), English association footballer for Oxford United
 Jack Stevens (rugby league), English rugby league player
 John Shorter Stevens (1933–2019), American lawyer and politician in North Carolina

See also
 Jack Steven (born 1990), Australian rules footballer for St Kilda
 Jack Stephens (disambiguation)
 John Stevens (disambiguation)